Wuhan Textile University, founded in 1958 as the Wuhan Institute of Textile Engineering, is a university in Wuhan, China. It was formerly an industry institution affiliated to the Ministry of Textile Industry of China. In 1998, it was adjusted by the Chinese National Education Management System and transferred to the management of Hubei Province. In 1999, it was renamed Wuhan Institute of Science and Technology. In 2002, Hubei Foreign Trade School was merged; in 2010, it was renamed Wuhan Textile University. 

Wuhan Textile University covers an area of more than 2,000 acres, and has four campuses: Nanhu (南湖), Yangguang (阳光), Donghu (东湖), and Xiongchu (雄楚). It has 20 teaching faculties and departments, with 67 undergraduate majors. The university has 15 authorized first-level master's degree disciplines and 9 authorized master's degree majors. There are around 2,000 faculty, and more than 20,000 full-time students of all levels and types.

History 

 In 1958, Wuhan Institute of Textile Engineering (武汉纺织工学院) was founded in Sancenglou, Wuchang District, and was administered by the government of Wuhan City. In the same year, Hubei School of Light Industry (湖北轻工业学校) was founded in Mafangshan, Wuchang District, and was administered by Wuhan Ministry of Light Industry.
 In 1962, Wuhan Institute of Textile Engineering was closed. Later during the Cultural Revolution, Hubei School of Light Industry ceased its operation, and remained closed until 1970.
 In 1978, with the order from State Education Commission, Wuhan Institute of Textile Engineering was reopened and put under the administration of National Ministry of Textile Industry (国家纺织工业部). Two more academies in the textile and light industry fields were established: Hubei Provincial School of Textile Industry (湖北省纺织工业学校) and Hubei Academy of Light Industry (湖北轻工业学院) 
 In 1998, after a reform in the system of education management, Wuhan Institute of Textile Engineering was co-administered by the national and Hubei provincial governments.
 In 1999, Wuhan Institute of Textile Engineering was renamed Wuhan University of Science and Engineering (武汉科技学院)
 In 2002, Hubei Foreign Trade School (湖北省对外贸易学院) was incorporated into Wuhan University of Science and Engineering.
 In 2003, Sun Zhigang, a student of Wuhan University of Science and Engineering, was beaten to death while being held in custody in Guangzhou. Custody and repatriation policy was abolished as a result.
 In 2006, with permission from the provincial government of Hubei, Hubei Academy of Finance and Economics (湖北财经高等专科学校) was put under the administration of Wuhan University of Science and Engineering.
 In 2010, Wuhan University of Science and Engineering was renamed Wuhan Textile University.
 In 2011, Hubei Academy of Finance and Economics was formally integrated into Wuhan Textile University.

Faculties and departments 

 Birmingham Institute of Fashion and Creative Art
 Institute of Technology
 School of Accounting
 School of Advanced Textile
 School of Art and Design
 School of Chemistry and Chemical Engineering
 School of Economics
 School of Electronic and Electrical Engineering
 School of Environment Engineering
 School of Fashion
 School of Foreign Languages
 School of Marxism
 School of Material Science and Engineering
 School of Mathematics and Computer Science
 School of Mechanical Engineering and Automation
 School of Media and Communication
 School of Textile Science and Engineering

References

Universities and colleges in Wuhan
1958 establishments in China